Live in Finland is a live album and DVD recorded by the Finnish power metal band Sonata Arctica. Live in Finland was recorded at Club Teatria in Oulu, Finland on 15 April 2011 during "The Days Of Grays" World Tour, and was released on 11 November 2011. Along with the CD, there is a DVD in stereo and Surround 5.1 sound, which also includes Finnish commentary track by the band, making-of videos, two documentaries, photos, and music videos. The DVD's cover was created by Xabier Loebl.

Track list: CD 1 - "Live in Finland"

Track list: CD 2 - "Sonata Arctica Open Air II"

Track list: DVD 1

Track list: DVD 2

Personnel
Tony Kakko - vocals, acoustic guitar
Elias Viljanen - electric and acoustic guitars & backing vocals
Henrik Klingenberg - keyboards, keytar, acoustic bass & backing vocals
Marko Paasikoski - bass, acoustic guitar & backing vocals
Tommy Portimo - drums, cajón

Charts

Info
Mixed by Pasi Kauppinen at Studio57
Mastered by Svante Forsbäck at Chartmakers

Credits
All songs written by Tony Kakko, except "Instrumental Exhibition" which was written by Henrik Klingenberg and Elias Viljanen
Arrangements by Sonata Arctica

References

Sonata Arctica albums
2011 live albums
Live video albums
2011 video albums
Nuclear Blast live albums
Nuclear Blast video albums